Udea minnehaha is a moth in the family Crambidae. It was described by Pryer in 1877. It is found in China (Zhejiang), Japan and Korea.

References

minnehaha
Moths described in 1877